Zeatrophon ambiguus common name the large trophon, is a species of large predatory sea snail, a marine gastropod mollusc in the family Muricidae, the rock snails or murex snails.

References

 Powell A W B, New Zealand Mollusca, William Collins Publishers Ltd, Auckland, New Zealand 1979

External links
 Spencer H.G., Willan R.C., Marshall B.A. & Murray T.J. (2011). Checklist of the Recent Mollusca Recorded from the New Zealand Exclusive Economic Zone.

Pagodulinae
Gastropods of New Zealand
Gastropods described in 1844
Taxa named by Rodolfo Amando Philippi